Paraburkholderia sprentiae is a Gram-negative, rod-shaped bacterium from the genus Paraburkholderia and the family Burkholderiaceae which was isolated from root nodules from the plant Lebeckia ambigua in South Africa.

The species was named in honor of Professor Janet Sprent of Dundee University, in recognition of her work on nitrogen fixation.

References

sprentiae
Bacteria described in 2013